Fawaz Mando (born 27 December 1971) is a former Syrian footballer who played for Al-Karamah and Syria national football team.

Career
Mando spent his entire career in Al-Karamah, from 1988 until 2000. He won the Syrian Premier League in 1996, and the Syrian Cup in 1995 and 1996.

Mando played for the Syria U20 in many tournaments: 1988 AFC Youth Championship, 1989 FIFA World Youth Championship, 1990 AFC Youth Championship, and 1991 FIFA World Youth Championship. Later on, he played for Syria until 2000.

References

External links

zerozero.pt

1971 births
Syrian footballers
Living people
Syria international footballers
Sportspeople from Homs
Al-Karamah players
Association football midfielders
Syrian Premier League players